The Ramberg, also called the Ramberg Massif, is a granite massif, about 30 square kilometres in area, in the eastern part of the Harz Mountains of central Germany. It is located in the federal state of Saxony-Anhalt and lies southwest of Quedlinburg, between Friedrichsbrunn, Gernrode, Harzgerode and Thale.

Places of interest 
In the vicinity of the Viktorshöhe are the two natural monuments, the Kleine Teufelsmühle and Große Teufelsmühle, two granite tors that are shrouded in legend. Also within the Ramberg are the Bremer Teich, the Bear Monument and the castles ruins of Erichsberg.

External links 
 Further information on the Ramberg at Harzlife
 Geology of the Ramberg at the Clausthal University of Technology

Mountains and hills of Saxony-Anhalt
Hills of the Harz